Palmwoods is a rural town and locality in the Sunshine Coast Region, Queensland, Australia.

Geography 

Palmwoods is part of the Sunshine Coast situated near Nambour. Palmwoods is located 15 minutes from the beach and the Blackall Range.

The North Coast railway line enters the locality from the south (Eudlo), passes through the town, and exits to the north-west (Woombye). The town is served by the Palmwoods railway station.

Pineapple growing remains the most important primary industry in the area.

History 

The small town was previously named Merriman Flats in 1881 by the Kuskopfs who were early European settlers in the area.

Palmwoods Provisional School opened on 21 October 1889. On 1 January 1909, it became Palmwoods State School. A preschool was added in 1985.

Palmwoods railway station opened in 1891 leading to the nearby town to be renamed Palmwoods after the Piccabeen Palm groves growing in the area.

Palmwoods Post Office opened by 1902 (a receiving office had been open from 1892).

Palmwoods Union Church opened in 1903. It was built from timber.

From 1915 to 1935, the Palmwoods-Buderim tramway connected Palmwoods to Buderim for the transport of passengers and goods.

Palmwoods Presbyterian Church was opened on Saturday 1 November 1924 by the Reverend James Gibson, the Moderator of the Queensland Presbyterian Assembly. Built from timber, it was the first church to open in Palmwoods. It was built using funds raised almost entirely by the local Women's Guild. It has subsequently closed and was demolished after 1975.

St Augustine of Canterbury Anglican church was opened and dedicated on Saturday 23 May 1925 by the Archbishop of Brisbane, Gerald Sharp. It was built from timber and fibro-cement at a cost of £435 and could seat 100 people. It was designed and built by Vincent Batt of Palmwoods.

Palmwoods Methodist Church was built from timber in 1928. It was officially opened on Friday 2 November 1928 by Reverend Charles Columbus Truman, President of the Queensland Methodist Synod. In 1977, it become the Palmwoods Uniting Church when the Methodist church entered into the amalgamation which formed the Uniting Church in Australia.

Immaculate Conception Catholic Church was officially opened by Monsignor James Byrne on Sunday 30 May 1926. It was built from timber  and was designed  by Cavanagh & Cavanagh. It  It was sold in 1977. It was at 3 Briggs Street.

Heritage listings 
Palmwoods has a number of heritage-listed sites, including:
 Palmwoods-Buderim Tramway
 Second oldest surviving ES&A Bank and Bank Manager's residence

Education 

Palmwoods State School is a government primary (Prep-6) school for boys and girls at 111 Palmwoods-Montville Road. In 2017, the school had an enrolment of 495 students with 40 teachers (37 full-time equivalent) and 23 non-teaching staff (13 full-time equivalent). In 2018, the school had an enrolment of 495 students with 44 teachers (37 full-time equivalent) and 25 non-teaching staff (13 full-time equivalent). It includes a special education program.

There is no secondary school in Palmwoods. The nearest government secondary school is Nambour State College in Nambour to the north.

Amenities 

The Sunshine Coast Regional Council operates a mobile library service which visits Main Street.

The Palmwoods branch of the Queensland Country Women's Association meets at the QCWA Hall at 11 Main Street.

St Augustine of Canterbury Anglican church is at 13 Hill Street.

Palmwoods Uniting Church is at 10 Church Street.

Attractions 
Palmwoods is regarded for its various eating and drinking establishments. The Palmwoods Pub, built in 1902, has recently undergone a multimillion-dollar renovation, and is known for creating job opportunities for backpackers.

References

External links

 

Towns in Queensland
Suburbs of the Sunshine Coast Region
Localities in Queensland